William Lawrence Bottomley (February 24, 1883 – February 1, 1951), was an American architect in twentieth-century New York City; Middleburg, Virginia; and Richmond, Virginia. He was known for his Colonial Revival designs of residential buildings in the United States and many of his commissions are situated in highly aspirational locations, including Monument Avenue in Richmond, Virginia.

Education 
Educated at the Horace Mann School in New York, Bottomley graduated from Columbia University in 1906 with a Bachelor of Science degree in architecture. In 1907 he studied at the American Academy in Rome, where he had received the McKim Fellowship in Architecture. In 1908 he entered the Ecole des Beaux-Arts in Paris, in the atelier of Victor Laloux, where he studied until he returned to the US to practice formally as an architect in 1909.

Personal life 
William Lawrence married Harriet Townsend, a sculptor and writer, on August 26, 1909 at Beech Hill in Westport, New York. Harriet's love for gardening may have influenced William's strong alliance with landscape architect Charles Gillette. William and Harriet had three daughters: Harriet, Susan, and Virginia.

Career 

In his 40-year career, William designed 186 commissions, the majority of which (40%) were in Virginia. "Bottomley's clients...while well-to-do, didn't have names with the lofty status of Rockefeller, Whitney, or Widener." Eleven of Bottomley's commissions are currently listed individually on the National Register of Historic Places. Eight of these are in Virginia.
 
William Lawrence Bottomley designed this residence (see right photo) at 155 Western Promenade in Portland, Maine.

In 1918, young U.S. Army lawyer Walter G. Davis, Jr. worked with the American Commission to Negotiate Peace in Paris, resulting in the Treaty of Versailles, where Europe was divided after World War I. Two years later, he swept into fashionable 155 Western Promenade, with its 32-foot salon for entertaining; inset Grand Tour paintings collected by Davis during his travels; and a library featuring a priceless Zuber & Cie mural from Paris: the Boston panel of Views of North America.

His work is now the subject of the Historic Richmond Foundation's Year of Bottomley events.

Works
 1912: Southampton High School (now Southampton Town Hall), Southampton, New York
 1915: 2324 Monument Avenue, Richmond, Virginia
 1918: 2309 Monument Avenue, Richmond, Virginia
 1920: 155 Western Promenade, Portland, Maine
 1922–1924: addition to the Hotel Albert, New York City
 1923: 2315 Monument Avenue, Richmond, Virginia
 1923–1924: Blue Ridge Farm, Greenwood, Virginia
 1924: Stuart Court Apartments, Richmond, Virginia
 1924: 2601 Monument Avenue, Richmond, Virginia
 1926: William and Helen Ziegler House, 116-118 E 55th Street, New York City
 1928: Casa Maria (addition), Greenwood, Virginia
 1928: Dakota, Warrenton, Virginia
 1929: Waverly Hill, Staunton, Virginia
 1920s: 2320 Monument Avenue, Richmond, Virginia
 1920s: 2714 Monument Avenue, Richmond, Virginia
 1930s (remodeling): Rocklands, near Gordonsville, Virginia
 1933–1935 (remodeling): Col Alto, Lexington, Virginia
 1934: DeLeon F. Green House in the Weldon Historic District, Weldon, North Carolina
 1939: Newton White Mansion, Mitchelville, Maryland

References

Citations

Works cited

Further reading

External links
 William L. Bottomley architectural drawings, 1913-1946

American residential architects
1883 births
1951 deaths
Horace Mann School alumni
20th-century American architects
Columbia University alumni
American alumni of the École des Beaux-Arts
Architects from New York City
Architects from Richmond, Virginia
 American neoclassical architects